The 2007–08 season was Manchester City Football Club's sixth consecutive season playing in the Premier League, the top division of English football, and its 11th season since the Premier League was first created, with Manchester City as one of its original 22 founding member clubs. Overall, it was the team's 116th season playing in a division of English football, most of which have been spent in the top flight.

Season review 
The season started with a new owner in Thaksin Shinawatra and his newly appointed manager, Sven-Göran Eriksson. After spending three of the four previous Premier League seasons finishing in low mid-table positions (i.e., two to four places above the relegation zone), the Manchester City team was badly in need of an influx of new blood if it was to avoid a similar fate, or worse, in the upcoming season. Consequently, the newly infused funds from the club's wealthy Thai owner came at quite a fortuitous time for the team, and Eriksson was very active in the summer transfer market as he spent approximately £30 million adding eight relatively high-profile players to the City first team squad.

As a consequence of this mini spending spree Manchester City started the new season strongly and spent a large portion of it occupying one of the top five positions in the Premier League table. Unfortunately, the strong results of the first two-thirds of the season were not sustained in the final third and the team ultimately slipped down the rankings to finish the season in ninth place. This loss of form in the final months also led to Shinawatra summarily sacking Eriksson, a decision that was received with mixed emotions by the Manchester City supporters since both characters had achieved the status of "white knights" in their eyes for their respective financial and managerial contributions to the transformation of the club.
Two days after his end-of-season dismissal, on 2 June 2008 Eriksson was replaced by Mark Hughes.

This season also saw Manchester City gain entry into the next season's UEFA Cup competition by finishing sixth in the English "Fair Play" rankings (with the five teams ranked above City having already qualified for European competition).

Team kit 
Supplier: Le Coq Sportif / Sponsor: Thomas Cook

Kit description 
The start of the 2007–08 Premier League campaign saw a number of changes for Manchester City, the most notable being the hiring of former England manager Sven-Göran Eriksson, while a somewhat less prominent change for the club saw the termination of Reebok as the team's kit supplier (for the four previous seasons) with the French sportswear manufacturer, Le Coq Sportif, now resuming this role once again. The shirt sponsor continued to be Thomas Cook, although the travel company had undergone a name change during the close season after its announced merger with MyTravel Group in June 2007, with the newly merged company now being called Thomas Cook Group.

The switch to a new kit supplier resulted in three new team kits for this season. The new home kit consisted of a return to a full sky blue shirt, but now with vertical white pin stripes on the body (but not the sleeves and shoulders) together with matching solid sky blue socks and the traditional all white shorts. The shirt sported a Le Coq Sportif logo on the upper portion of both sleeves with the Manchester City crest in the centre of the chest above the Thomas Cook logo, while the City crest was also repeated at the base of the right leg on the shorts.

The new away kit – a striking solid purple colour but sporting the same vertical white pin stripes on the body of the shirt as the home kit plus all the same kit supplier, sponsorship and club crest logos – was possibly a throwback to the classic maroon and thin white striped shirts that had been the club's one-time strip created for its appearance at Wembley in the 1956 FA Cup Final against Birmingham City. In comparison to the new home and away kits, the new third kit consisted of a relatively conservative all white shirt and socks with solid sky blue shorts, with the white shirt sporting a thin sky blue diagonal sash across the front of the left shoulder.

New goalkeeper strips – a two-tone green (solid light green shirt plus solid dark green shorts and socks), an all-grey change and a yellow third with purple shorts and socks, were introduced for this season.

On 10 February 2008, during the club's local derby game against Manchester United, the City team played in a one-off special kit to mark the 50-year memorial of the Munich air disaster. This kit was devoid of the pinstripes, contained no kit supplier or sponsorship logos and had a black ribbon on the right shoulder bearing "1958–2008", with "Manchester remembers" written underneath.

Historical league performance 
Prior to this season, the history of Manchester City's performance in the English football league hierarchy since the creation of the Premier League in 1992 is summarised by the following timeline chart – which commences with the last season (1991–92) of the old Football League First Division (from which the Premier League was formed).

Friendly games

Pre-season

Thomas Cook Trophy

Post-season

Competitive games

Premier League

Position in final standings

Results summary

Points breakdown 

Points at home: 37 
Points away from home: 18 

Points against "Big Four" teams: 7 
Points against promoted teams: 13

6 points: Manchester United, Newcastle United, Sunderland
4 points: Aston Villa, Bolton Wand., Derby County, Portsmouth, West Ham Utd.
3 points: Birmingham City, Middlesbrough, Reading, Tottenham Hotspur
2 points: Wigan Athletic
1 point: Blackburn Rovers, Fulham, Liverpool
0 points: Arsenal, Chelsea, Everton

Biggest & smallest 
Biggest home wins: 4–2 vs. Bolton Wanderers, 15 December 2007 
3–1 vs. Middlesbrough, 7 October 2007 & vs. Portsmouth, 20 April 2008 
& vs. Newcastle United, 29 September 2007 
Biggest home defeats: 1–3 vs. Arsenal, 2 February 2008 
0–2 vs. Everton, 25 February 2008 & vs. Chelsea, 5 April 2008 
Biggest away wins: 0–2 vs. West Ham, 11 Aug. 2007 & vs. Newcastle Utd., 2 Jan. 2008 
Biggest away defeat: 8–1 vs. Middlesbrough, 11 May 2008 

Biggest home attendance: 47,321 vs. Liverpool, 30 December 2007 
Smallest home attendance: 38,261 vs. Wigan Athletic, 1 March 2008 
Biggest away attendance: 75,970 vs. Manchester United, 10 February 2008 
Smallest away attendance: 18,614 vs. Wigan Athletic, 1 December 2007

Results per matchday

Individual match reports

League Cup

FA Cup

Playing statistics 

Information current as of 11 May 2008 (end of season)

Goal scorers

All competitions

Premier League

League Cup

FA Cup 

Information current as of 11 May 2008 (end of season)

Awards

Premier League awards 
Awarded monthly to the player and manager that were chosen by a panel assembled by the Premier League's sponsor

Thomas Cook Player of the Month awards 
Awarded to the player in each category that receives the most votes in a poll conducted each month on the MCFC OWS

Football Association of Ireland awards

Official Supporters Club awards

Transfers and loans

Transfers in

First team

Reserves & Academy

Transfers out

First team

Reserves & Academy

Loans in

First team

Reserves & Academy

Loans out

First team

Reserves & Academy

References 

Manchester City F.C. seasons
Manchester City
Articles which contain graphical timelines